Wolfgang Amadeus Mozart's Piano Sonata No. 5 in G major, K. 283 / 189h, (1774) is a piano sonata in three movements:

This sonata is part of the earliest group of sonatas that Mozart published in the mid-1770s. The first movement is a sonata-allegro movement that is concise, with an economy of materials. The development section is a mere 18 measures long. The shorter length and moderate technical demands make it an ideal piece for early-advanced study and performance.

A typical performance takes twelve to eighteen (Richter) minutes.

The work was written down during the visit Mozart paid to Munich for the production of his La finta giardiniera from late 1774 to the beginning of the following March.

External links

  (Alte Mozart-Ausgabe version)
Recording by Paavali Jumppanen from the Isabella Stewart Gardner Museum in MP3 format

Piano Sonata 05
Compositions in G major
1774 compositions